John Michael 'Rab' Rabinovich FRSE FRCS FRCSE LLD (1900–18 February 1982) was a geneticist and physicist who co-founded the science of mutagenesis by mutations in fruit flies exposed to mustard gas. He was Professor at Guy's Hospital Medical School.

Life

Born in Belgium to a Russian Jewish family, Rabinovich came prior to World War I in England, where he attended school in Leeds.

He studied science at the University of Leeds graduating with a BSc in 1922. He then took a second degree in medicine graduating with an MB ChB in 1925. In 1929 he joined the staff of the Institute of Animal Genetics in Edinburgh alongside Alan William Greenwood. In 1934 he began lecturing in pharmacology at the University of Edinburgh

He changed his name to Robson, and was appointed assistant to Bertold Wiesner at the Institute of Animal Genetics in the University of Edinburgh. In 1932 he was appointed lecturer at the Department of Pharmacology at the University of Edinburgh, and thereafter pharmacology became his specialism, though he maintained a strong interest in hormone research. In addition to studies of the effects of hormones on the human uterus, he also worked on toxicology and chemotherapy.

In 1940, along with Charlotte Auerbach and A.J. Clark, he discovered that mustard gas could cause mutations in fruit flies, founding the science of mutagenesis. He continued earlier research on sex hormones when he moved to the Pharmacology Department of Guy's Hospital Medical School, London in 1946, but grew more interested in the similar effects of exposure to mustard gas with exposure to X-rays. Robson's pharmacological research paved the way for the development of the contraceptive pill in the 1960s. While there he undertook research on the effects of gonadotrophins in pregnancy, and also supervised the Pregnancy Diagnosis Station that had been founded by the Institute's director Professor Francis Crew.

In 1932 he received an honorary doctorate (DSc) from the University of Edinburgh and was elected a Fellow of the Royal Society of Edinburgh. His proposers were Francis Albert Eley Crew, Bertold Wiesner, Alan William Greenwood, and Sir Edward Albert Sharpey-Schafer.

In 1946 he moved to London as a Reader in Pharmacology at Guy's Hospital Medical School, and was given a professorship there in 1950. Here he focussed upon endocrinology.

He retired in 1968, and was made Emeritus Professor at Guys. He died in London on 18 February 1982 aged 79.

Publications
Recent Advances in Sex and Reproductive Physiology (1934)
Recent Advances in Pharmacology (1950)

Family

Robson married Sarah Benjamin in September 1930 in Leeds.

References

 
 JM Robson biography

Belgian Jews
British people of Russian-Jewish descent
British pharmacists
Jewish scientists
Scottish Jews
1900 births
1982 deaths
Fellows of the Royal Society of Edinburgh
Alumni of the University of Edinburgh
Belgian physicists
Belgian geneticists
Belgian emigrants to Canada
Belgian endocrinologists
Belgian emigrants to the United Kingdom
British physicists
British endocrinologists
British geneticists
Canadian physicists
Canadian geneticists
20th-century Belgian scientists
20th-century British scientists
20th-century Canadian scientists
Scientists from London
Scientists from Ontario
Presidents of the Canadian Association of Physicists